R81 may refer to:
 R81 (South Africa), a road
 , a destroyer of the Royal Navy
 , an aircraft carrier of the Royal Netherlands Navy